Revenge of the Bridesmaids is a 2010 ABC Family Original Movie that premiered on July 18, 2010. It stars Raven-Symoné as Abigail and Joanna García as Parker, undercover bridesmaids with a mission to break up a wedding. In addition, the film's cast also features Virginia Williams, Beth Broderick, Chryssie Whitehead, David Clayton Rogers, Lyle Brocato and Brittany Ishibashi.

Plot 
Two 29-year-old women, Abigail Scanlon and Parker Wald, best friends since childhood, return to their small hometown of Lambert, Louisiana from New York City for a visit. During a party to celebrate Parker's parents' wedding anniversary, they run into old friends. They learn that their close friend, Rachel, has lost the love of her life, Tony, to their ex-friend, Caitlyn, a conniving gold-digger who pretends to be pregnant to trick Tony into marrying her so that she can use his money to keep her family's estate. Intent upon preventing a loveless marriage, Parker and Abigail go "undercover" as Caitlyn's bridesmaids to sabotage the wedding. Along the way, Caitlyn's tightly wound mother, Olivia, works hard to keep Abigail and Parker at bay as Parker falls for the town detective Henry Kent. The bridesmaids put their best-laid plans in motion only to see them go outrageously awry with Olivia interfering as much as possible. As a result, Abigail, Parker and Rachel are arrested by Henry, but Parker convinces him to release them. So Abigail, Parker, and Rachel sneak into the wedding and kidnap Caitlyn. They take her to the hospital for a pregnancy test and trick her into admitting the truth. At the wedding ceremony Tony lies to Caitlyn that his family lost their fortunes which leads to her canceling the wedding and storming off. After Caitlyn is gone, Tony gets on one knee and proposes to Rachel, also revealing that he lied and is still rich.
At the end of the film, Parker stars in a major action film with Henry at her side as her consultant, Rachel marries Tony, and Abigail sells her book on their antics as bridesmaids.

Cast 
 Raven-Symoné as Abigail Scanlon
 Joanna García as Parker Wald
 Virginia Williams as Caitlyn McNabb
 Beth Broderick as Olivia McNabb, Caitlyn's mother
 Chryssie Whitehead as Rachel Phipps
 David Clayton Rogers as Henry Kent
 Lyle Brocato as Anthony "Tony" Penning Phipps
Brittany Ishibashi as Bitsy
 Maureen Brennan as Penny Wald
 Gary Grubbs as Lou Wald 
 Ann McKenzie as Charlotte Willington
 Angelena Swords as Ashlie
 Lacey Minchew as Ashley
 Billy Slaughter as Gary
 Carl J. Walker as Glen Woodward
 Esmeralda Alaniz as Young Abby 
 Evelyn Boyle as Young Parker
 Audrey P. Scott as Young Caitlyn
 Talia Tooraen as Young Rachel

Production 
In March 2010, Raven-Symoné announced that she would star in an upcoming romantic comedy for ABC Family, via Say Now. This is her first television film since The Cheetah Girls 2 in 2006.

Filming took place in April 2010 in New Orleans, Louisiana at the Opera Guild Home (previously named the Davis-Seybold Mansion) and at the Houmas House in Burnside, Louisiana. Jim Hayman directed the film.

Reception and release 
The film received 2.55 million viewers at its premiere, placing it in the top 5 "highest-rated" ABC Family Original Movie premieres list.

The film was released on DVD in the US on April 26, 2011.

Awards

References

External links 
 

2010 romantic comedy films
2010 television films
2010 films
Films shot in New Orleans
ABC Family original films
2010s English-language films
2010s female buddy films
Films set in Louisiana
Films about weddings